The 1999–2000 Macedonian Second Football League was the eighth season since its establishment. It began in August 1999 and ended in May 2000. Due to change of the league structure in season 2000–01, the 19 teams was relegated.

East

Participating teams

League standing

West

Participating teams

League standing

Relegation playoff 

Shkëndija Arachinovo were won the match and stayed in the Macedonian Second League, while Tiverija were relegated to the Macedonian Third League.

Mesna Industrija were won the match and promoted to the Macedonian Second League.

Mladost GT Orizari were won the match and promoted to the Macedonian Second League.

11 Oktomvri were won the match and promoted to the Macedonian Second League.

Source: Nova Makedonija

See also
1999–2000 Macedonian Football Cup
1999–2000 Macedonian First Football League

References

External links
Macedonia - List of final tables (RSSSF)
Football Federation of Macedonia 
MacedonianFootball.com 

Macedonia 2
2
Macedonian Second Football League seasons